Bijahil Chalwa (born 30 November 1990) is an Indonesian professional footballer who plays as a forward for Liga 3 club Persibo Bojonegoro.

Club career

Persela Lamongan
He scored his first hattrick in a 3–0 win against Persebaya Surabaya on 10 February 2014.

References

External links
 
 Bijahil Chalwa at Liga Indonesia

1990 births
Living people
People from Bojonegoro Regency
Indonesian footballers
Liga 1 (Indonesia) players
Persibo Bojonegoro players
Persikabo Bogor players
Persela Lamongan players
Indonesian Premier Division players
Association football forwards
Sportspeople from East Java